Sadabad (also Romanized as Sa‘dābād) is a city in Sadabad District of Dashtestan County, Bushehr province, Iran. At the 2006 census, its population was 7,119 in 1,588 households. The following census in 2011 counted 7,859 people in 1,935 households. The latest census in 2016 showed a population of 8,248 people in 2,341 households.

References 

Cities in Bushehr Province
Populated places in Dashtestan County